The 2013 ULM Warhawks baseball team represents University of Louisiana at Monroe in the NCAA Division I baseball season of 2013. The Tigers played their home games in Warhawk Field. The team is coached by Jeff Schexnaider, who is in his seventh season at ULM. In the 2012 season, the Warhawks reached the NCAA Regionals for the first time in more than 10 years; also, the Warhawks did win the post season Sun Belt championship.

Pre-season

Key Losses
Joey Rapp, IF/OF, .322 BA, 9 HRs, 51 RBI, 44 Runs (Grad. / Drafted)
Jeremy Sy, IF, .330 BA, 15 2Bs, 53 Runs, 37 RBI (Graduation / Drafted)
Randy Zeigler, P, 5-7, 3.69 ERA, 112.1 IP, 111 Ks, .234 Opp BA (Drafted)
Wil Browning, P, 8-3, 6 Saves, 3.41 ERA, 60.2 IP, 56 Ks (Grad. / Signed)
Fraser Adams, P, 2-1, 3.57 ERA, 40.1 IP, 34 Ks, .329 Opp BA (Graduation)
Les Aulds, OF, .245, 24-34 SBs, 37 Runs, 28 RBI (Graduation)
Caleb Clowers, IF, .300 BA, 10 2Bs, 38 Runs, 34 RBI (Graduation)
Kendall Thamm, P, 7-3, 2 Saves, 3.28 ERA, 71.1 IP, 52 Ks (Graduation)

Key Players Returning
Taylor Abdalla, Sr., OF, .215 BA, 16 XBH, 31 RBI, 25 Runs
Brandon Alexander, Sr., OF, .280 BA, 12 XBH, 33 Runs, 32 RBI
Shelby Aulds, Sr., RH, 3-3, 5.23 ERA, 62.0 IP, 45 Ks, .291 Opp BA
Judd Edwards, Sr., IF, .293 BA, 13 2Bs, 45 Runs, 27 RBI
Corben Green, R-Sr., IF, .261 BA, 13 2Bs, 33 Runs, 32 RBI
Cale Wine, R-Sr., RH, 6-4, 4.03 ERA, 98.1 IP, 56 Ks, .266 Opp BA

Personnel

Roster

2013 LSU Tigers Baseball Roster & Bios http://www.lsusports.net/SportSelect.dbml?&DB_OEM_ID=5200&SPID=2173&SPSID=27867

Coaching Staff

2013 ULM Warhawks Baseball Coaches & Bios http://www.lsusports.net/SportSelect.dbml?&DB_OEM_ID=5200&SPID=2173&SPSID=28707

Schedule/Results

References

Louisiana–Monroe Warhawks baseball seasons
Louisiana-Monroe Warhawks
Louis